The Wandering Jew is a mythical immortal man whose legend began to spread in Europe in the 13th century. In the original legend, a Jew who taunted Jesus on the way to the Crucifixion was then cursed to walk the Earth until the Second Coming. The exact nature of the wanderer's indiscretion varies in different versions of the tale, as do aspects of his character; sometimes he is said to be a shoemaker or other tradesman, while sometimes he is the doorman at the estate of Pontius Pilate.

Name
An early extant manuscript containing the Legend is the Flores Historiarum by Roger of Wendover, where it appears in the part for the year 1228, under the title Of the Jew Joseph who is still alive awaiting the last coming of Christ. The central figure is named Cartaphilus before being baptized later by Ananias as Joseph. The root of the name Cartaphilus can be divided into kartos and philos, which can be translated roughly as "dearly" and "loved", connecting the Legend of the Wandering Jew to "the disciple whom Jesus loved".

At least from the 17th century, the name Ahasver has been given to the Wandering Jew, apparently adapted from Ahasuerus (Xerxes), the Persian king in the Book of Esther, who was not a Jew, and whose very name among medieval Jews was an exemplum of a fool. This name may have been chosen because the Book of Esther describes the Jews as a persecuted people, scattered across every province of Ahasuerus' vast empire, similar to the later Jewish diaspora in countries whose state and/or majority religions were forms of Christianity.

A variety of names have since been given to the Wandering Jew, including Matathias, Buttadeus and Isaac Laquedem which is a name for him in France and the Low Countries, in popular legend as well as in a novel by Dumas. The name Paul Marrane (an anglicized version of Giovanni Paolo Marana, the alleged author of Letters Writ by a Turkish Spy) was incorrectly attributed to the Wandering Jew by a 1911 Encyclopædia Britannica article, yet the mistake influenced popular culture. The name given to the Wandering Jew in the spy's Letters is Michob Ader.

The name Buttadeus (Botadeo in Italian; Boutedieu in French) most likely has its origin in a combination of the Vulgar Latin version of batuere ("to beat or strike") with the word for God, deus. Sometimes this name is misinterpreted as Votadeo, meaning "devoted to God", drawing similarities to the etymology of the name Cartaphilus.

Where German or Russian is spoken, the emphasis has been on the perpetual character of his punishment, and thus he is known there as Ewiger Jude and vechny zhid (вечный жид), the "Eternal Jew". In French and other Romance languages, the usage has been to refer to the wanderings, as in le Juif errant (French), judío errante (Spanish) or l'ebreo errante (Italian) and this has been followed in English from the Middle Ages, as the Wandering Jew. In Finnish, he is known as Jerusalemin suutari ("Shoemaker of Jerusalem"), implying he was a cobbler by his trade. In Hungarian, he is known as the bolygó zsidó ("Wandering Jew" but with a connotation of aimlessness).

Origin and evolution

Biblical sources

The origins of the legend are uncertain; perhaps one element is the story in Genesis of Cain, who is issued with a similar punishment—to wander the Earth, scavenging and never reaping, although without the related punishment of endlessness. According to Jehoshua Gilboa, many commentators have pointed to Hosea 9:17 as a statement of the notion of the "eternal/wandering Jew".
According to some sources, the legend stems from Jesus' words given in Matthew 16:28:

A belief that the disciple whom Jesus loved would not die was apparently popular enough in the early Christian world to be denounced in the Gospel of John:

Another passage in the Gospel of John speaks about a guard of the high priest who slaps Jesus (John 18:19-23). Earlier, the Gospel of John talks about Simon Peter striking the ear from Malchus, a servant of the high priest (John 18:10). Although this servant is probably not the same guard who struck Jesus, Malchus is nonetheless one of the many names given to the wandering Jew in later legend.

Early Christianity

The later amalgamation of the fate of the specific figure of legend with the condition of the Jewish people as a whole, well established by the 18th century, had its precursor even in early Christian views of Jews and the diaspora. Extant manuscripts have shown that as early as the time of Tertullian, some Christian proponents were likening the Jewish people to a "new Cain", asserting that they would be "fugitives and wanderers (upon) the earth".

Aurelius Prudentius Clemens (b. 348) writes in his Apotheosis (c. 400): "From place to place the homeless Jew wanders in ever-shifting exile, since the time when he was torn from the abode of his fathers and has been suffering the penalty for murder, and having stained his hands with the blood of Christ whom he denied, paying the price of sin."

A late 6th and early 7th century monk named Johannes Moschos records an important version of a Malchean figure. In his Leimonarion, Moschos recounts meeting a monk named Isidor who had purportedly met a Malchus-type of figure who struck Christ and is therefore punished to wander in eternal suffering and lament:

Medieval legend
Some scholars have identified components of the legend of the Eternal Jew in Teutonic legends of the Eternal Hunter, some features of which are derived from Odin mythology.

"In some areas the farmers arranged the rows in their fields in such a way that on Sundays the Eternal Jew might find a resting place. Elsewhere they assumed that he could rest only upon a plough or that he had to be on the go all year and was allowed a respite only on Christmas."

Most likely drawing on centuries of unwritten folklore, legendry, and oral tradition brought to the West as a product of the Crusades, a Latin chronicle from Bologna, Ignoti Monachi Cisterciensis S. Mariae de Ferraria Chronica et Ryccardi de Sancto Germano Chronica priora, contains the first written articulation of the Wandering Jew. In the entry for the year 1223, the chronicle describes the report of a group of pilgrims who meet "a certain Jew in Armenia" (quendam Iudaeum) who scolded Jesus on his way to be crucified and is therefore doomed to live until the Second Coming. Every hundred years the Jew returns to the age of 30.

A variant of the Wandering Jew legend is recorded in the Flores Historiarum by Roger of Wendover around the year 1228. An Armenian archbishop, then visiting England, was asked by the monks of St Albans Abbey about the celebrated Joseph of Arimathea, who had spoken to Jesus, and was reported to be still alive. The archbishop answered that he had himself seen such a man in Armenia, and that his name was Cartaphilus, a Jewish shoemaker, who, when Jesus stopped for a second to rest while carrying his cross, hit him, and told him "Go on quicker, Jesus! Go on quicker! Why dost Thou loiter?", to which Jesus, "with a stern countenance", is said to have replied: "I shall stand and rest, but thou shalt go on till the last day." The Armenian bishop also reported that Cartaphilus had since converted to Christianity and spent his wandering days proselytizing and leading a hermit's life.

Matthew Paris included this passage from Roger of Wendover in his own history; and other Armenians appeared in 1252 at the Abbey of St Albans, repeating the same story, which was regarded there as a great proof of the truth of the Christian religion. The same Armenian told the story at Tournai in 1243, according to the Chronicles of Phillip Mouskes, (chapter ii. 491, Brussels, 1839). After that, Guido Bonatti writes people saw the Wandering Jew in Forlì (Italy), in the 13th century; other people saw him in Vienna and elsewhere.

There were claims of sightings of the Wandering Jew throughout Europe and later the Americas, since at least 1542 in Hamburg up to 1868 in Harts Corners, New Jersey. Joseph Jacobs, writing in the 11th edition of the Encyclopædia Britannica (1911), commented "It is difficult to tell in any one of these cases how far the story is an entire fiction and how far some ingenious impostor took advantage of the existence of the myth". It has been alleged by an 1881 writer, who however cites no instances, that the supposed presence of the Wandering Jew has occasionally been used as a pretext for incursions by Gentiles into Jewish quarters during the late Middle Ages, when the legend was accepted as fact.

Another legend about Jews, the so-called "Red Jews", was similarly common in Central Europe in the Middle Ages.

In literature

17th and 18th centuries

The legend became more popular after it appeared in a 17th-century pamphlet of four leaves,  (Short Description and Tale of a Jew with the Name Ahasuerus). "Here we are told that some fifty years before, a bishop met him in a church at Hamburg, repentant, ill-clothed and distracted at the thought of having to move on in a few weeks." As with urban legends, particularities lend verisimilitude: the bishop is specifically Paulus von Eitzen, General Superintendent of Schleswig. The legend spread quickly throughout Germany, no less than eight different editions appearing in 1602; altogether forty appeared in Germany before the end of the 18th century. Eight editions in Dutch and Flemish are known; and the story soon passed to France, the first French edition appearing in Bordeaux, 1609, and to England, where it appeared in the form of a parody in 1625. The pamphlet was translated also into Danish and Swedish; and the expression "eternal Jew" is current in Czech, Slovak, and German, . Apparently the pamphlets of 1602 borrowed parts of the descriptions of the wanderer from reports (most notably by Balthasar Russow) about an itinerant preacher called Jürgen.

In France, the Wandering Jew appeared in Simon Tyssot de Patot's  (1720).

In Britain a ballad with the title The Wandering Jew was included in Thomas Percy's Reliques published in 1765.

In England the Wandering Jew makes an appearance in one of the secondary plots in Matthew Lewis's Gothic novel The Monk (1796). The Wandering Jew is depicted as an exorcist whose origin remains unclear. The Wandering Jew also plays a role in St. Leon (1799) by William Godwin. The Wandering Jew also appears in two English broadside ballads of the 17th and 18th centuries, The Wandering Jew, and The Wandering Jew's Chronicle. The former recounts the biblical story of the Wandering Jew's encounter with Christ, while the latter tells, from the point of view of the titular character, the succession of English monarchs from William the Conqueror through either King Charles II (in the 17th-century text) or King George II and Queen Caroline (in the 18th-century version).

In 1797 the operetta The Wandering Jew, or Love's Masquerade by Andrew Franklin was performed in London.

19th century

Britain

In 1810 Percy Bysshe Shelley wrote a poem in four cantos with the title The Wandering Jew but it remained unpublished until 1877. In two other works of Shelley, Ahasuerus appears, as a phantom in his first major poem Queen Mab: A Philosophical Poem (1813) and later as a hermit healer in his last major work, the verse drama Hellas.

Thomas Carlyle, in his Sartor Resartus (1833–34), compares its hero Diogenes Teufelsdröckh on several occasions to the Wandering Jew (also using the German wording ).

In Chapter 15 of Great Expectations (1861) by Charles Dickens, the journeyman Orlick is compared to the Wandering Jew.

George MacDonald includes pieces of the legend in Thomas Wingfold, Curate (London, 1876).

The minor Cornish poet James Dryden Hosken (1861–1953) concluded "A Monk's Love" (1894) with a long poem "Ahaseurus" which he later adapted into a dramatic monologue included in his heavily revised play "Marlowe" published in "Shores of Lyonesse" 1923.

United States

Nathaniel Hawthorne's stories "A Virtuoso's Collection" and "Ethan Brand" feature the Wandering Jew serving as a guide to the stories' characters.

In 1873 a publisher in the United States (Philadelphia, Gebbie) produced The Legend of the Wandering Jew, a series of twelve designs by Gustave Doré (Reproduced by Photographic Printing) with Explanatory Introduction, originally made by Doré in 1856 to illustrate a short poem by Pierre-Jean de Béranger. For each one, there was a couplet, such as "Too late he feels, by look, and deed, and word, / How often he has crucified his Lord".

Eugene Field's short story "The Holy Cross" (1899) features the Jew as a character.

In 1901 a New York publisher reprinted, under the title "Tarry Thou Till I Come", George Croly's "Salathiel", which treated the subject in an imaginative form. It had appeared anonymously in 1828.

In Lew Wallace's novel The Prince of India (1893), the Wandering Jew is the protagonist. The book follows his adventures through the ages, as he takes part in the shaping of history. An American rabbi, H.M. Bien, turned the character into the "Wandering Gentile" in his novel Ben-Beor: A Tale of the Anti-Messiah; in the same year John L. McKeever wrote a novel, The Wandering Jew: A Tale of the Lost Tribes of Israel.
978-1470091880
A humorous account of the Wandering Jew appears in chapter 54 of Mark Twain's 1869 travel book The Innocents Abroad.

John Galt published a book in 1820 called The Wandering Jew.

Germany

The legend has been the subject of German poems by Schubart, Aloys Schreiber, Wilhelm Müller, Lenau, Chamisso, Schlegel, Julius Mosen (an epic, 1838), and Köhler; of novels by Franz Horn (1818), Oeklers, and Schücking; and of tragedies by Klingemann ("", 1827) and Zedlitz (1844). It is either the Ahasuerus of Klingemann or that of Ludwig Achim von Arnim in his play, Halle and Jerusalem to whom Richard Wagner refers in the final passage of his notorious essay .

There are clear echoes of the Wandering Jew in Wagner's The Flying Dutchman, whose plot line is adapted from a story by Heinrich Heine in which the Dutchman is referred to as "the Wandering Jew of the ocean", and his final opera  features a woman called Kundry who is in some ways a female version of the Wandering Jew. It is alleged that she was formerly Herodias, and she admits that she laughed at Jesus on his route to the Crucifixion, and is now condemned to wander until she meets with him again (cf. Eugene Sue's version, below).

Robert Hamerling, in his  (Vienna, 1866), identifies Nero with the Wandering Jew. Goethe had designed a poem on the subject, the plot of which he sketched in his .

Denmark

Hans Christian Andersen made his "Ahasuerus" the Angel of Doubt, and was imitated by Heller in a poem on "The Wandering of Ahasuerus", which he afterward developed into three cantos. Martin Andersen Nexø wrote a short story named "The Eternal Jew", in which he also refers to Ahasuerus as the spreading of the Jewish gene pool in Europe.

The story of the Wandering Jew is the basis of the essay "The Unhappiest One" in Søren Kierkegaard's Either/Or (published 1843 in Copenhagen). It is also discussed in an early portion of the book that focuses on Mozart's opera Don Giovanni.

In the play "Genboerne" (The neighbors across the street), the Wandering Jew is a character (in this context called "Jerusalem's shoemaker") and his shoes will make you invisible when you wear them. The protagonist of the play borrows the shoes for a night and visits the house across the street as an invisible man.

France

The French writer Edgar Quinet published his prose epic on the legend in 1833, making the subject the judgment of the world; and  wrote his  in 1844, in which the author connects the story of Ahasuerus with that of Herodias. Grenier's 1857 poem on the subject may have been inspired by 's designs, which were published the preceding year. One should also note 's  (1864), which combines several fictional Wandering Jews, both heroic and evil, and Alexandre Dumas' incomplete  (1853), a sprawling historical saga. In Guy de Maupassant's short story 'Uncle Judas' the local people believe that the old man in the story is the Wandering Jew.

Russia

In Russia, the legend of the Wandering Jew appears in an incomplete epic poem by Vasily Zhukovsky, "Ahasuerus" (1857) and in another epic poem by Wilhelm Küchelbecker, "Ahasuerus, a Poem in Fragments", written between 1832 and 1846 but not published until 1878, long after the poet's death. Alexander Pushkin also began a long poem on Ahasuerus (1826) but later abandoned the project, completing under thirty lines.

Other literature

The Wandering Jew makes a notable appearance in the gothic masterpiece of the Polish writer Jan Potocki, The Manuscript Found in Saragossa, written about 1797.

Brazilian writer and poet Machado de Assis often used Jewish themes in his writings. One of his short stories,  ("To Live!"), is a dialog between the Wandering Jew (named as Ahasverus) and Prometheus at the end of time. It was published in 1896 as part of the book  (Several stories).

Castro Alves, another Brazilian poet, wrote a poem named "" ("Ahasverus and the genie"), in a reference to the Wandering Jew.

The Hungarian poet János Arany also wrote a ballad called "", meaning "The everlasting Jew".

The Slovenian poet Anton Aškerc wrote a poem called "Ahasverjev tempelj" ("Ahasverus' Temple").

The Spanish military writer José Gómez de Arteche's novel Un soldado español de veinte siglos (A Spanish soldier of twenty centuries) (1874–1886) depicts the Wandering Jew as serving in the Spanish military of different periods.

20th century

Latin America

In Mexican writer Mariano Azuela's 1920 novel set during the Mexican Revolution, The Underdogs (Spanish: "Los de abajo"), the character Venancio, a semi-educated barber, entertains the band of revolutionaries by recounting episodes from The Wandering Jew, one of two books he had read.

In Argentina, the topic of the Wandering Jew has appeared several times in the work of Enrique Anderson Imbert, particularly in his short-story  (The Grimoire), included in the eponymous book.

Chapter XXXVII, in the collection of short stories, Misteriosa Buenos Aires, by the Argentine writer Manuel Mujica Láinez also centres round the wandering of the Jew.

The Argentine writer Jorge Luis Borges named the main character and narrator of his short story "The Immortal" Joseph Cartaphilus (in the story he was a Roman military tribune who gained immortality after drinking from a magical river and dies in the 1920s).

In Green Mansions, W.H. Hudson's protagonist Abel, references Ahasuerus, as an archetype of someone, like himself, who prays for redemption and peace; while condemned to walk the earth.

In 1967, the Wandering Jew appears as an unexplained magical realist townfolk legend in Gabriel García Márquez's One Hundred Years of Solitude.

A Colombian writer, Prospero Morales Pradilla, in his novel  (The sins of Ines de Hinojosa) describes the famous Wandering Jew of Tunja that has been there since the 16th century. He talks about the wooden statue of the Wandering Jew that is in Santo Domingo church and every year during the holy week is carried around on the shoulders of the Easter penitents around the city. The main feature of the statue are his eyes; they can express the hatred and anger in front of Jesus carrying the cross.

Brazil

In 1970, Polish-Brazilian writer Samuel Rawet published , a short-story in which the main character, Ahasverus, or The Wandering Jew, is capable of transforming into various other figures.

France

Guillaume Apollinaire parodies the character in "" in his
collection  (1910).

Jean d'Ormesson:  (1991)

Simone de Beauvoir: in her novel  (1946, All Men are Mortal), the leading figure Raymond Fosca undergoes a fate similar to the wandering Jew, who is being explicitly mentioned as a reference.

Germany

In both Gustav Meyrink's The Green Face (1916) and Leo Perutz's
The Marquis of Bolibar (1920), the Wandering Jew features as a central character.
The German writer Stefan Heym in his novel  (translated into English as The Wandering Jew) maps a story of Ahasuerus and Lucifer ranging between ancient times, the Germany of Luther and socialist East Germany. In Heym's depiction, the Wandering Jew is a highly sympathetic character.

Belgium

The Belgian writer August Vermeylen published in 1906 a novel called  (The Wandering Jew).

Romania

Mihai Eminescu, an influential Romanian writer, depicts in his romantic fantastic novella  a variation. A student follows a surreal journey through the book of Zoroaster, a book seeming to give him God-like abilities. The book is given to him by Ruben, his Jewish master who is a philosopher. Dan is eventually tricked by Ruben and is sentenced by God to a life of insanity, which he can escape only by resurrection.

Similarly, Mircea Eliade presents in his novel Dayan (1979) a student's mystic and fantastic journey through time and space under the guidance of the Wandering Jew, in the search of a higher truth and of his own self.

Russia

The Soviet satirists Ilya Ilf and Yevgeni Petrov had their hero Ostap Bender tell the story of the Wandering Jew's death at the hands of Ukrainian nationalists in The Little Golden Calf. In Vsevolod Ivanov's story Ahasver a weird man comes to a Soviet writer in Moscow in 1944, introduces himself as "Ahasver the cosmopolite" and claims he is Paul von Eitzen, a theologian from Hamburg, who concocted the legend of Wandering Jew in the 16th century to become rich and famous but then turned himself into a real Ahasver against his will. The novel Overburdened with Evil (1988) by Arkady and Boris Strugatsky involves a character in modern setting who turns out to be Ahasuerus, identified at the same time in a subplot with John the Divine. In the novel Going to the Light (1998) by Sergey Golosovsky, Ahasuerus turns out to be Apostle Paul, punished (together with Moses and Mohammed) for inventing false religion.

South Korea

The 1979 Korean novel Son of Man by Yi Mun-yol (introduced and translated into English by Brother Anthony, 2015), is framed within a detective story.  It describes the character of Ahasuerus as a defender of humanity against unreasonable laws of the Jewish god, Yahweh.  This leads to his confrontations with Jesus and withholding of aid to Jesus on the way to Calvary.  The unpublished manuscript of the novel was written by a disillusioned theology student, Min Yoseop, who has been murdered.  The text of the manuscript provides clues to solving the murder.  There are strong parallels between Min Yoseop and Ahasuerus, both of whom are consumed by their philosophical ideals.

Sweden

In Pär Lagerkvist's 1956 novel The Sibyl, Ahasuerus and a woman who was once the Delphic Sibyl each tell their stories, describing how an interaction with the divine damaged their lives.

Ukraine
In Ukrainian legends, there is a character of Marko Pekelnyi (Marko of Hell, Marko the Infernal) or Marko the Accursed. This character is based on the archetype of Wandering Jew. The origin of Marko's image is also rooted in the legend of the traitor Mark, who struck Christ with an iron glove before his death on the cross, for which the Lord was punished by eternally walking underground around a pillar, not stopping even for a minute; he bangs his head against a pillar from time to time, disturbs even hell and its master with these sounds and complains that he cannot die. Another explanation for Mark's curse is that he fell in love with his own sister, then killed her along with his mother, for which he was punished by God

Ukrainian authors Oleksa Storozhenko, Lina Kostenko, Ivan Malkovych and others have written prose and poetry about Marko the Infernal. Also, Les Kurbas Theatre made a stage performance "Marko the Infernal, or the Easter Legend" based on the poetry of Vasyl Stus

United Kingdom

Bernard Capes' story "The Accursed Cordonnier" (1900) depicts the Wandering Jew as a figure of menace.

Robert Nichols' novella "Golgotha & Co." in his collection Fantastica (1923) is a
satirical tale where the Wandering Jew is a successful businessman who subverts the Second Coming.

In Evelyn Waugh's Helena, the Wandering Jew appears in a dream to the protagonist and shows her where to look for the Cross, the goal of her quest.

J. G. Ballard's short story "The Lost Leonardo", published in The Terminal Beach (1964), centres on a search for the Wandering Jew. The horror novel Devil Daddy (1972) by John Blackburn features the Wandering Jew.

The Wandering Jew appears as a sympathetic character in Diana Wynne Jones's young adult novel The Homeward Bounders. His fate is tied in with larger plot themes regarding destiny, disobedience, and punishment.

United States
In O. Henry's story "The Door of Unrest", a drunk shoemaker Mike O'Bader comes to a local newspaper editor and claims to be the Jerusalem shoemaker Michob Ader who did not let Christ rest upon his doorstep on the way to crucifixion and was condemned to live until the Second Coming. However, Mike O'Bader insists he is a Gentile, not a Jew.

An unidentified Jewish Wanderer appears in A Canticle for Leibowitz, a post-apocalyptic science fiction novel by Walter M. Miller, Jr. first published in 1960; some children are heard saying of the old man, "What Jesus raises up STAYS raised up", implying that he is St. Lazarus of Bethany, whom Christ raised from the dead. Another possibility hinted at in the novel is that this character is also Isaac Edward Leibowitz, founder of the Albertian Order of St. Leibowitz (and who was martyred for trying to preserve books from burning by a savage mob). The character speaks and writes in Hebrew and English, and wanders around the desert, though he has a tent on a mesa overlooking the abbey founded by Leibowitz, which is the setting for almost all the novel's action. The character appears again in three subsequent novellas which take place hundreds of years apart, and in Miller's 1997 follow-up novel, Saint Leibowitz and the Wild Horse Woman.

Ahasuerus must remain on Earth after space travel is developed in Lester del Rey's "Earthbound" (1963). The Wandering Jew also appears in Mary Elizabeth Counselman's story "A Handful of Silver" (1967). Barry Sadler has written a series of books featuring a character called Casca Rufio Longinus who is a combination of two characters from Christian folklore, Saint Longinus and the Wandering Jew. Jack L. Chalker wrote a five-book series called The Well World Saga in which it is mentioned many times that the creator of the universe, a man named Nathan Brazil, is known as the Wandering Jew. The 10th issue of DC Comics' Secret Origins (January 1987) gave The Phantom Stranger four possible origins. In one of these explanations, the Stranger confirms to a priest that he is the Wandering Jew. Angela Hunt's novel The Immortal (2000) features the Wandering Jew under the name of Asher Genzano.

George Sylvester Viereck and Paul Eldridge wrote a trilogy of novels My First Two Thousand Years: an Autobiography of the Wandering Jew (1928), in which Isaac Laquedem is a Roman soldier who, after being told by Jesus that he will "tarry until I return", goes on to influence many of the great events of history. He frequently encounters Solome (described as "The Wandering Jewess"), and travels with a companion, to whom he has passed on his immortality via a blood transfusion (another attempt to do this for a woman he loved ended in her death).

"Ahasver", a cult leader identified with the Wandering Jew, is a central figure in Anthony Boucher's classic mystery novel Nine Times Nine (originally published 1940 under the name H. Holmes). The Wandering Jew encounters a returned Christ in Deborah Grabien's 1990 novel Plainsong.

In Ilium by Dan Simmons (2003), a woman who is addressed as the Wandering Jew plays a central role, though her real name is Savi.

The Wandering Jew is revealed to be Judas Iscariot in George R.R. Martin's distant-future science fiction parable of Christianity, the 1979 short story "The Way of Cross and Dragon".

"The Wandering Jew" is the title of a short poem by Edwin Arlington Robinson which appears in his book The Three Taverns. In the poem, the speaker encounters a mysterious figure with eyes that "remembered everything". He recognizes him from "his image when I was a child" and finds him to be bitter, with "a ringing wealth of old anathemas"; a man for whom the "world around him was a gift of anguish". The speaker does not know what became of him, but believes that "somewhere among men to-day / Those old, unyielding eyes may flash / And flinch—and look the other way."

Although he does not appear in Robert A. Heinlein's novel Time Enough for Love [1973], the central character, Lazarus Long, claims to have encountered the Wandering Jew at least once, possibly multiple times, over the course of his long life. According to Lazarus, he was then using the name Sandy Macdougal and was operating as a con man. He is described as having red hair and being, in Lazarus' words, a "crashing bore".

Written by Isaac Asimov in October 1956, the short story "Does a Bee Care?" features a highly influential character named Kane who is stated to have spawned the legends of the Walking Jew and the Flying Dutchman in his thousands of years maturing on Earth, guiding humanity toward the creation of technology which would allow it to return to its far-distant home in another solar system.  The story originally appeared in the June 1957 edition of "If: Worlds of Science Fiction" magazine and is collected in the anthology "Buy Jupiter and Other Stories" (Isaac Asimov, Doubleday Science Fiction, 1975).

21st century

Brazil

Brazilian writer Glauco Ortolano in his 2000 novel Domingos Vera Cruz: Memorias de um Antropofago Lisboense no Brasil uses the theme of the Wandering Jew for its main character, Domingos Vera Cruz, who flees to Brazil in one of the first Portuguese expeditions to the New World after murdering his wife's lover in Portugal. In order to avoid eternal damnation, he must fully repent of his crime. The book of memoirs Domingos dictates in the 21st century to an anonymous transcriber narrates his own saga throughout 500 years of Brazilian history. At the end, Domingos indicates he is finally giving in as he senses the arrival of the Son of Man.

Ireland
Local history and legends have made reference to The Wandering Jew having haunted an abandoned water-mill on the edge of Dunleer town.

United Kingdom

English writer Stephen Gallagher uses the Wandering Jew as a theme in his 2007 novel The Kingdom of Bones. The Wandering Jew is a character, a theater manager and actor, who turned away from God and toward depravity in exchange for long life and prosperity. He must find another person to take on the persona of the wanderer before his life ends or risk eternal damnation. He eventually does find a substitute in his protégé, Louise. The novel revolves around another character's quest to find her and save her from her assumed damnation.

Sarah Perry's 2018 novel Melmoth is part-inspired by the Wandering Jew, and makes several references to the legend in discussing the origin of its titular character.

JG Ballard's short story "The Lost Leonardo" features the Wandering Jew as a mysterious art thief.

United States

 In Underneath the Lintel the main character suspects a 113-year overdue library book was checked out and returned by the Wandering Jew
 The Wandering Jew appears in "An Arkham Halloween" in the October 30, 2017 issue of Bewildering Stories, as a volunteer to help Miskatonic University prepare a new translation of the Necronomicon, particularly qualified because he knew the author.
The Wandering Jew appears in Angela Hunt’s inspirational novel “The Immortal” (2000) and is named Asher Genzano.

Uzbekistan

Uzbek writer Isajon Sulton published his novel The Wandering Jew in 2011. In this novel, the Jew does not characterize a symbol of curse; however, they appear as a human being, who is aware of God's presence, after being cursed by Him. Moreover, the novel captures the fortune of present-day wandering Jews, created by humans using high technologies.

In art

19th century

19th-century works depicting the legendary figure as the Wandering (or Eternal) Jew or as Ahasuerus (Ahasver) include:

 1846, Wilhelm von Kaulbach, Titus destroying Jerusalem. Neue Pinakothek Munich. which had been commissioned from Kaulbach in 1842 and was completed in 1866, was destroyed by war damage during World War II. 
 1836 Kaulbach's work initially commissioned by Countess Angelina Radzwill; 
 1840 Kaulbach published a booklet of Explanations identifying the main figures; 
 1846 finished work purchased by King Ludwig I of Bavaria for the royal collections; 1853 installed in Neue Pinakothek, Munich.; 
 1842 Kaulbach's replica for the stairway murals of the Neues Museum, Berlin commissioned by King Frederick William IV of Prussia; 
 1866 completed; 
 1943 destroyed by war damage.
 1848–1851, Théophile Schuler's monumental painting The Chariot of Death features a prominent depiction of the Wandering Jew (who is driven away by Death)
 1852, a coloured caricature was used as a cover design for the June number of the satirical Journal pour rire, published by Charles Philipon.
 1854, Gustave Courbet, The Meeting.
 1856, Gustave Doré, twelve folio-size illustrations produced for a short poem by Pierre-Jean de Béranger, The Legend of the Wandering Jew, derived from a novel by Eugène Sue (1845)
 1876, Maurycy Gottlieb, Ahasver. National Museum, Kraków.
 1888, Adolf Hirémy-Hirschl, Ahasuerus at the End of the World. Private Collection.
 1899, Samuel Hirszenberg, The Eternal Jew. Exhibited in Łódź, Warsaw and Paris in 1899, now in the Israel Museum, Jerusalem.

20th century
In another artwork, exhibited at Basel in 1901, the legendary figure with the name Der ewige Jude, The Eternal Jew, was shown redemptively bringing the Torah back to the Promised Land.

Among the paintings of Marc Chagall having a connection with the legend, one has the explicit title Le Juif Errant (1923–1925).

In his painting The Wandering Jew (1983) Michael Sgan-Cohen depicts a birdlike figure standing with a black hand pointed to the back of its head, as if it were holding a gun; another hand points down from heaven is using the motif of the Hand of God and suggesting the divine origin of the curse. The birdlike figure depicted is wearing a Judenhut. The empty chair in the foreground of the painting is a symbol of how the figure cannot settle down and is forced to keep wandering.

In ideology (19th century and after)

By the beginning of the eighteenth century, the figure of the "Wandering Jew" as a legendary individual had begun to be identified with the fate of the Jewish people as a whole. After the ascendancy of Napoleon Bonaparte at the end of the century and the emancipating reforms in European countries connected with the policy of Napoleon and the Jews, the "Eternal Jew" became an increasingly "symbolic... and universal character" as the continuing struggle for Jewish emancipation in Prussia and elsewhere in Europe in the course of the nineteenth century gave rise to what came to be referred to as "the Jewish Question".

Before Kaulbach's mural replica of his painting Titus destroying Jerusalem had been commissioned by the King of Prussia in 1842 for the projected Neues Museum, Berlin, Gabriel Riesser's essay "Stellung der Bekenner des mosaischen Glaubens in Deutschland" ("On the Position of Confessors of the Mosaic Faith in Germany") had been published in 1831 and the journal Der Jude, periodische Blätter für Religions und Gewissensfreiheit (The Jew, Periodical for Freedom of Religion and Thought) had been founded in 1832. In 1840 Kaulbach himself had published a booklet of Explanations identifying the main figures for his projected painting, including that of the Eternal Jew in flight as an outcast for having rejected Christ. In 1843 Bruno Bauer's book The Jewish Question was published, where Bauer argued that religious allegiance must be renounced by both Jews and Christians as a precondition of juridical equality and political and social freedom. to which Karl Marx responded with an article by the title "On the Jewish Question".

A caricature which had first appeared in a French publication in 1852, depicting the legendary figure with "a red cross on his forehead, spindly legs and arms, huge nose and blowing hair, and staff in hand", was co-opted by anti-Semites. It was shown at the Nazi exhibition Der ewige Jude in Germany and Austria in 1937–1938. A reproduction of it was exhibited at Yad Vashem in 2007 (shown here).

The exhibition had been held at the Library of the German Museum in Munich from 8 November 1937 to 31 January 1938 showing works that the Nazis considered to be "degenerate art". A book containing images of these works was published under the title The Eternal Jew. It had been preceded by other such exhibitions in Mannheim, Karlsruhe, Dresden, Berlin and Vienna. The works of art displayed at these exhibitions were generally executed by avant-garde artists who had become recognized and esteemed in the 1920s, but the objective of the exhibitions was not to present the works as worthy of admiration but to deride and condemn them.

Portrayal in popular media

Stage

Fromental Halévy's opera Le Juif errant, based on the novel by Sue, was premiered at the Paris Opera (Salle Le Peletier) on 23 April 1852, and had 48 further performances over two seasons. The music was sufficiently popular to generate a Wandering Jew Mazurka, a Wandering Jew Waltz, and a Wandering Jew Polka.

A Hebrew-language play titled The Eternal Jew premiered at the Moscow Habimah Theatre in 1919 and was performed at the Habima Theatre in New York in 1926.

Donald Wolfit made his debut as the Wandering Jew in a stage adaptation in London in 1924. The play Spikenard (1930) by C. E. Lawrence, has the Jew wander an uninhabited Earth along with Judas and the Impenitent thief. Glen Berger's 2001 play Underneath the Lintel is a monologue by a Dutch librarian who delves into the history of a book that is returned 113 years overdue and becomes convinced that the borrower was the Wandering Jew.

Film

There have been several films on the topic of The Wandering Jew:
 1904 silent film called Le Juif Errant by Georges Méliès
 1923 saw The Wandering Jew, a British silent film by Maurice Elvey from the basis of E. Temple Thurston's play, starring Matheson Lang. The play had been produced both in Twickenham, London and on Broadway in 1921, the latter co-produced by David Belasco. The play, as well as the two films based upon it, attempts to tell the legend literally, taking the Jew from Biblical times to the Spanish Inquisition. 
 Elvey also directed the sound remake The Wandering Jew (1933), with Conrad Veidt in the title role; the film was so popular it broke box office records at the time.
 In 1933, the Jewish Talking Picture Company released a Yiddish-language film entitled The Eternal Jew. 
 In 1940, a propaganda pseudo-documentary film was made in Nazi Germany entitled Der ewige Jude (The Eternal Jew), reflecting Nazism's antisemitism, linking the legend with alleged Jewish malpractices over the ages. 
 Another film version of the story, made in Italy in 1948, starred Vittorio Gassman.
 In the 1988 film The Seventh Sign the Wandering Jew appears as Father Lucci, who identifies himself as the centuries-old Cartaphilus, Pilate's porter, who took part in the scourging of Jesus before his crucifixion.
The 1993 film Needful Things, based on the 1991 novel of the same name by Stephen King, has elements of the Wandering Jew legend.
 The 2000 horror film Dracula 2000 and its sequels equate the Wandering Jew with Judas Iscariot.
 A 2007 science fiction film The Man from Earth is similar to the Wandering Jew story in many aspects.
 The 2009 film An Education described both Graham and David Goldman this way, though Lynn Barber's original memoirs it was based on did not.
 The 2015 film He Never Died portrays a recovering cannibal who is eventually revealed to be Cain from The Bible, hence the title.

Television
 In the third episode of the first season of The Librarians, the character Jenkins mentions the Wandering Jew as an "immortal creature that can be injured, but never killed".
 In the third season of the FX series Fargo, a character named Paul Murrane (played by Ray Wise) appears to three major characters. He acts as a source of counsel to two of them (one of whom he provides a chance at redemption), while forcing the third to confront his past involvement in numerous killings. Though the character is widely believed to represent the Wandering Jew, the name is associated with a historical mistake: it is an anglicized version of Paolo Marana (Giovanni Paolo Marana allegedly authored Letters Writ by a Turkish Spy whose second volume features the Wandering Jew), rather than a known alias of the legendary figure.
 In the Japanese manga and accompanying anime series The Ancient Magus' Bride, the Wandering Jew is represented in the antagonist of Cartaphilus. In his search to end his eternal suffering, Cartaphilus serves as a nuisance to the progression of Chise's training.
 In the television series Peaky Blinders, Jewish gangster Alfie Solomons (played by Tom Hardy), described himself as "The Wandering Jew".
 In "Lagrimas", an episode of the second season of Witchblade, he is portrayed by Jeffrey Donovan as a mysterious drifter who develops a romantic relationship with protagonist Sara Pezzini. His true identity is later revealed to be the cursed Roman soldier Cartaphilus, who hopes the Witchblade can finally bring an end to his suffering.
 In the television series Rawhide the Wandering Jew features in the episode "Incident of the Wanderer" (Season 6, episode 21).
 In the television adaptation of The Sandman, in reference to a meeting of the characters Morpheus and Hob Gadling, Johanna Constantine remarks on a rumor that The Devil and the Wandering Jew meet once every hundred years in a tavern.

Comics

In Arak: Son of Thunder issue 8, the titular character encounters the Wandering Jew. Arak intervenes on behalf of a mysterious Jewish man who is about to be stoned by the people of a village. Later on, that same individual serves as a guide through the Catacombs of Rome as they seek out the lair of the Black Pope, who holds Arak's allies hostage. His name is given as Josephus and he tells Arak that he is condemned to wander the Earth after mocking Christ en route to the crucifixion.

The DC Comics character Phantom Stranger, a mysterious hero with paranormal abilities, was given four possible origins in an issue of Secret Origins with one of them identifying him as the Wandering Jew. He now dedicates his time to helping mankind, even declining a later offer from God to release him from his penance.

In Deitch's A Shroud for Waldo, serialized in weekly papers such as New York Press and released in book form by Fantagraphics, the hospital attendant who revives Waldo as a hulking demon so he can destroy the AntiChrist, is none other than the Wandering Jew. For carrying out this mission, he is awarded a normal life and, it is implied, marries the woman he just rescued. Waldo, having reverted to cartoon cat form, is also rewarded, finding it in a freight car.

In Neil Gaiman's The Sandman comic series, the character Hob Gadling represents the archetypal Wandering Jew.

In Kore Yamazaki's manga The Ancient Magus' Bride, the character Cartaphilus, also known as Joseph, is a mysterious being that looks like a young boy, but is much older. He is dubbed "The Wandering Jew" and is said to have been cursed with immortality for throwing a rock at the Son of God. It is later revealed that Joseph and Cartaphilus used to be two different people until Joseph fused with Cartaphilus in an attempt to remove his curse, only to become cursed himself.

In Katsuhisa Kigitsu's manga "Franken Fran" chapter 24 titled "Immortality" the main character Fran discovers a man who can't die. Once the man is allowed to write he reveals he is in fact The Wandering Jew.

Plants
Various types of plants are called by the common name "wandering Jew", apparently because of these plants' ability to spread over wide territories (see ). Recently there have been efforts to change the common name of Tradescantia from "wandering Jew" to "wandering dude" or "wandering tradescantia" to avoid antisemitism.

See also
 Hob Gadling
 Prester John
 Spiderwort

Notes

References

Bibliography
  Collects both literary versions and folk versions.
 
 
 Cohen, Richard I. The "Wandering Jew" from Medieval Legend to Modern Metaphor, in Barbara Kirshenblatt-Gimblett and Jonathan Karp (eds), The Art of Being Jewish in Modern Times (Philadelphia, University of Pennsylvania Press, 2007) (Jewish Culture and Contexts)
 Gaer, Joseph (Fishman) The Legend of the Wandering Jew New American Library, 1961 (Dore illustrations) popular account
 Hasan-Rokem, Galit and Alan Dundes The Wandering Jew: Essays in the Interpretation of a Christian Legend (Bloomington:Indiana University Press) 1986. 20th-century folkloristic renderings.
 
 Manning, Robert Douglas Wandering Jew and Wandering Jewess 
 Sabine Baring-Gould, Curious Myths of the Middle Ages (1894)

External links
 Wandering Jew and Jewess dramatic screenplays
 
 David Hoffman, Hon. J.U.D. of Gottegen (1852). Chronicles of the Wandering Jew selected from the originals of Carthaphilus, embracing a period of nearly XIX centuries—detailed description of facts related to Jesus's preaching from a Pharisees coverage
 Catholic Encyclopedia entry
 The (presumed) End of the Wandering Jew from The Golden Calf by Ilf and Petrov
 Israel's First President, Chaim Weizmann, "A Wandering Jew" Shapell Manuscript Foundation
 "The Wandering Image: Converting the Wandering Jew" Iconography and visual art.
 "The Wandering Jew" and "The Wandering Jew's Chronicle" English Broadside Ballad Archive
 Full text:  [Alternative format]

 
Fictional characters introduced in the 13th century
Curses
Antisemitic canards
Christian folklore
Immortality
Medieval legends
Medieval Jews
Fictional Jews
Literary archetypes by name
Mythological characters
European folklore